Paschal Constantine Degera (born April 29, 1945) is a former Member of Parliament in the National Assembly of Tanzania.

References

1945 births
Living people
Members of the National Assembly (Tanzania)
Place of birth missing (living people)